This is a list of public art in Hampshire, in England. This list applies only to works of public art accessible in an outdoor public space. For example, this does not include artwork visible inside a museum.

Aldershot

Alton

Basingstoke

Eastleigh

Fareham

Gosport

Lasham

Petersfield

Portsmouth

Romsey

Southampton

Stratfield Saye

Whitchurch

Winchester

References 

Hampshire
Tourist attractions in Hampshire